During World War II, the United States Army Air Forces (USAAF) established numerous airfields in Pennsylvania for training pilots and aircrews of USAAF fighters and bombers.

Most of these airfields were under the command of First Air Force or the Army Air Forces Training Command (AAFTC) (A predecessor of the current-day United States Air Force Air Education and Training Command).  However the other USAAF support commands (Air Technical Service Command (ATSC); Air Transport Command (ATC) or Troop Carrier Command) commanded a significant number of airfields in a support roles.

It is still possible to find remnants of these wartime airfields. Many were converted into municipal airports, some were returned to agriculture and several were retained as United States Air Force installations and were front-line bases during the Cold War. Hundreds of the temporary buildings that were used survive today, and are being used for other purposes.

Major Airfields 
Air Technical Service Command
 Connellsville MAP, Connellsville
 Now: Joseph A. Hardy Connellsville Airport 
 Olmsted Field AAF, Middletown
 487th/496th Army Air Force Base Unit
 Was: Olmsted Air Force Base (1947-1968)
 Now: Harrisburg International Airport 

First Air Force
 Philadelphia Northeast Airport, Philadelphia, Pennsylvania
 431st Army Air Force Base Unit (Reduced)
 Now: Northeast Philadelphia Airport   
 Reading AAF, Reading
 390th Army Air Force Base Unit
 Now: Reading Regional Airport 

Air Transport Command
 Pittsburgh Army Air Base, Pittsburgh
 Now: Pittsburgh IAP Air Reserve Station 

Army Air Forces Training Command
 Waynesboro MAP, Waynesboro
 Contract Primary Pilot Training
 Closed, 1950 Now: non-aviation industrial site.

Other
 Other known airfields used by the USAAF were at Ebensburg, Milton, Beaver Falls and Williamsport.  It has yet to be discovered what use the AAF made of those facilities.

References
 Maurer, Maurer (1983). Air Force Combat Units Of World War II. Maxwell AFB, Alabama: Office of Air Force History. .
 Ravenstein, Charles A. (1984). Air Force Combat Wings Lineage and Honors Histories 1947–1977. Maxwell AFB, Alabama: Office of Air Force History. .
 Thole, Lou (1999), Forgotten Fields of America : World War II Bases and Training, Then and Now - Vol. 2.  Pictorial Histories Pub . 
 Military Airfields in World War II - Pennsylvania

External links

 01
World War II
World War II
Airfields of the United States Army Air Forces in the United States by state
United States World War II army airfields